Axianassidae is a family of crustaceans belonging to the infraorder Gebiidea, within the order Decapoda.

It contains the following genera:
 Axianassa Schmitt, 1924
 Heteroaxianassa Sakai, 2016

References

Crustaceans